Mati Ilisson (born 24 May 1960 in Tõrva) is an Estonian politician. He was a member of VIII Riigikogu, representing the Social Democratic Party.

References

1960 births
Living people
Social Democratic Party (Estonia) politicians
Estonian Free Party politicians
Members of the Riigikogu, 1995–1999
Estonian University of Life Sciences alumni
People from Tõrva